Campylaspis is a genus of crustaceans in the order Cumacea. Species of Campylaspis have a "bulky" carapace, which makes up more than 40% of the animal's length, as well as distinctive features of the mouthparts. There are currently 170 recognised described species:

Campylaspis aculeata Jones, 1974
Campylaspis aegypta Mühlenhardt-Siegel, 2009
Campylaspis affinis Sars, 1870
Campylaspis africana Băcescu & Maradian, 1972
Campylaspis akabensis Bacescu & Muradian, 1975
Campylaspis akymata Muhlenhardt-Siegel, 2005
Campylaspis alba Hansen, 1920
Campylaspis alisae Corbera, 2008
Campylaspis alveolata Muradian, 1976
Campylaspis amblyoda Gamo, 1960
Campylaspis anae Petrescu, 2006
Campylaspis angelae Petrescu, 2006
Campylaspis angularis Gamo, 1960
Campylaspis antarctica Calman, 1907
Campylaspis antipai Bacescu & Petrescu, 1989
Campylaspis aperta Lomakina, 1958
Campylaspis apheles Gerken, 2012
Campylaspis arcuata Jones, 1974
Campylaspis aspera Hale, 1945
Campylaspis aulacoeis Le Loeuff & Intes, 1972
Campylaspis australiensis Petrescu, 2006
Campylaspis bacescui Muradian, 1976
Campylaspis bicarinata Jones, 1974
Campylaspis biplicata Watling & McCann, 1996
Campylaspis bituberculata Gerken, 2012
Campylaspis blakei Watling & McCann, 1996
Campylaspis bonetti Băcescu & Maradian, 1972
Campylaspis brasilianus Bacescu & Petrescu, 1989
Campylaspis brevicornis Jones, 1974
Campylaspis breviramis Ledoyer, 1993
Campylaspis bulbosa Jones, 1974
Campylaspis canaliculata Zimmer, 1936
Campylaspis caperata Jones, 1974
Campylaspis caribbeana Petrescu, 2002
Campylaspis clavata Lomakina, 1952
Campylaspis cognata Jones, 1974
Campylaspis costata (Sars, 1865)
Campylaspis cousteaui Petrescu, 1990
Campylaspis crispa Lomakina, 1955
Campylaspis depressa Ledoyer, 1988
Campylaspis echinata Hale, 1945
Campylaspis edenensis Petrescu, 2006
Campylaspis exarata Jones, 1974
Campylaspis excavata Ledoyer, 1993
Campylaspis frigida Hansen, 1908
Campylaspis fusiformis Gamo, 1960
Campylaspis gamoi Jones, 1984
Campylaspis glabra Sars, 1878
Campylaspis glebulosa Jones, 1974
Campylaspis globosa Hansen, 1920
Campylaspis gloriosae Ledoyer, 1988
Campylaspis granulata Gamo, 1960
Campylaspis grossui Petrescu, 2006
Campylaspis guttata Jones, 1974
Campylaspis halei Petrescu, 2006
Campylaspis hartae Lie, 1969
Campylaspis hatchae Gerken, 2012
Campylaspis heardi Muradian-Ciamician, 1980
Campylaspis heterotuberculata Corbera, 2000
Campylaspis hirsuta Petrescu, 2006
Campylaspis holthuisi Bacescu & Petrescu, 1989
Campylaspis horrida Sars, 1870
Campylaspis horridoides Stephensen, 1915
Campylaspis inornata Jones, 1969
Campylaspis intermedia Hansen, 1920
Campylaspis johnstoni Hale, 1937
Campylaspis jonesi Băcescu & Maradian, 1972
Campylaspis kiiensis Gamo, 1960
Campylaspis laevigata Jones, 1974
Campylaspis laticarpa Hansen, 1920
Campylaspis latidactyla Hale, 1945
Campylaspis latimera Petrescu, 2006
Campylaspis latipes Ledoyer, 1988
Campylaspis ledoyeri Petrescu & Wittman, 2003
Campylaspis legendrei Fage, 1951
Campylaspis longidentata Petrescu, 2006
Campylaspis lynseyae Petrescu, 2006
Campylaspis macrophthalma Sars, 1878
Campylaspis macrosulcata Gerken, 2012
Campylaspis maculata Zimmer, 1907
Campylaspis maculinodulosa Watlin & McCann, 1996
Campylaspis mansa Jones, 1974
Campylaspis mauritanica Băcescu & Maradian, 1972
Campylaspis menziesi Muradian, 1979
Campylaspis microdentata Ledoyer, 1988
Campylaspis microsulcata Gerken, 2012
Campylaspis millsae Gerken, 2012
Campylaspis minor Hale, 1945
Campylaspis minuta Radhadevi & Kurian, 1989
Campylaspis mozambica Ledoyer, 1988
Campylaspis multinodosa Jones, 1974
Campylaspis nemoi Muhlenhardt-Siegel, 2000
Campylaspis nitens Bonnier, 1896
Campylaspis nodulosa Sars, 1886
Campylaspis normani Gerken, 2012
Campylaspis nowrae Petrescu, 2006
Campylaspis nuda Jones, 1974
Campylaspis orientalis Calman, 1911
Campylaspis ovalis Stebbing, 1912
Campylaspis pacifica Sars, 1886
Campylaspis paeneglabra Stebbing, 1912
Campylaspis papillata Lomakina, 1952
Campylaspis paucinodosa Jones, 1974
Campylaspis pileus Foxon, 1932
Campylaspis pilosa Jones, 1974
Campylaspis pisum Vassilenko & Tzareva, 2004
Campylaspis platyuropus Calman, 1911
Campylaspis plicata Jones, 1974
Campylaspis poorei Petrescu, 2006
Campylaspis porcata Jones, 1974
Campylaspis propinqua Jones, 1974
Campylaspis pseudosquamifera Ledoyer, 1988
Campylaspis pulchella Sars, 1873
Campylaspis pumila Gamo, 1960
Campylaspis pustulosa Hale, 1945
Campylaspis quadridentata Ledoyer, 1993
Campylaspis quadriplicata Lomakina, 1968
Campylaspis rectangulata Petrescu, 2006
Campylaspis redacta Jones, 1974
Campylaspis reticulata Gamo, 1960
Campylaspis rex Gerken & Ryder, 2002
Campylaspis roscida Hale, 1945
Campylaspis rostellata Jones, 1974
Campylaspis rostrata Calman, 1905
Campylaspis rubicunda (Liljeborg, 1855)
Campylaspis rubromaculata Lie, 1969
Campylaspis rufa Hart, 1930
Campylaspis rufus Gerken, 2012
Campylaspis rupta Hale, 1945
Campylaspis sagamiensis Gamo, 1967
Campylaspis schnabelae Gerken, 2012
Campylaspis sculpta Petrescu, 2006
Campylaspis sculptaspinosa Gerken, 2012
Campylaspis scuta Jones, 1984
Campylaspis selvakumarani (Bacescu & Muradian, 1974)
Campylaspis serrata Petrescu, 2006
Campylaspis serratipes Hansen, 1920
Campylaspis setifera Petrescu, 2006
Campylaspis similis Hale, 1945
Campylaspis sinuosa Gamo, 1960
Campylaspis spinifera Petrescu, 2006
Campylaspis spinosa Calman, 1906
Campylaspis squamifera Fage, 1929
Campylaspis stephenseni Just, 1970
Campylaspis sticta Jones, 1974
Campylaspis striata Gamo, 1960
Campylaspis submersa Jones, 1974
Campylaspis sulcata Sars, 1870
Campylaspis tasmaniensis Petrescu, 2006
Campylaspis thetidis Hale, 1945
Campylaspis thompsoni Hale, 1945
Campylaspis totzkei Muhlenhardt-Siegel, 2000
Campylaspis triplicata Hale, 1945
Campylaspis trisulcata Petrescu, 2006
Campylaspis tuberculata Muradian, 1976
Campylaspis tubulata Fage, 1945
Campylaspis tumulifera Jones, 1984
Campylaspis umbensis Gurwitch, 1939
Campylaspis undata Sars, 1864
Campylaspis uniplicata Hale, 1945
Campylaspis unisulcata Hale, 1945
Campylaspis urodentata Ledoyer, 1988
Campylaspis valida Jones, 1984
Campylaspis valleculata Jones, 1974
Campylaspis vemae Muradian, 1979
Campylaspis verrucosa Sars, 1866
Campylaspis vitrea Calman, 1906
Campylaspis wardi Bacescu, 1991
Campylaspis zealandiaensis Gerken, 2012
Campylaspis zimmeri Gerken, 2012

References

External links

Cumacea